Silverdale is a civil parish in Lancaster, Lancashire, England. It contains 20 buildings that are recorded in the National Heritage List for England as designated listed buildings.  Of these, two are at Grade II*, the middle grade, and the others are at Grade II, the lowest grade.  Most of the listed buildings in the parish are houses and associated structures, or farmhouses and farm buildings.  The other listed buildings include a former chimney, a church, a public house, and a limekiln.

Key

Buildings

References

Citations

Sources

Lists of listed buildings in Lancashire
Buildings and structures in the City of Lancaster